The County of Adelaide is one of the 49 cadastral counties of South Australia and contains the city of Adelaide. It was proclaimed on 2 June 1842 by Governor Grey. It is bounded by the Gawler River and North Para River in the north, the Mount Lofty Ranges in the east, and Gulf St Vincent in the west. The south border runs from Aldinga Bay to Willunga South and Mount Magnificent.

The county held at least 60% of South Australia's population between 1855 and 1921; this figure rose to 70.6% in 1966.

Hundreds 
The county is divided into the following hundreds, from north west to south east:
 Hundred of Port Adelaide in the north west beside Gulf St Vincent between the Gawler River and Grand Junction Road
 Hundred of Barossa in the north spanning the Barossa Range
 Hundred of Munno Para in the north between the Gawler and Little Para rivers
 Hundred of Para Wirra in the north east immediately south of the South Para River
 Hundred of Yatala beside Gulf St Vincent between the Little Para and Torrens rivers
 Hundred of Talunga in the east, spanning the Torrens Valley in the Adelaide Hills
 Hundred of Adelaide in the west beside Gulf St Vincent and south of the Torrens River
 Hundred of Onkaparinga in the east spanning the Onkaparinga Valley in the Adelaide Hills
 Hundred of Noarlunga in the south west beside Gulf St Vincent between the Sturt and Onkaparinga rivers
 Hundred of Willunga in the south beside Gulf St Vincent and immediately south of the Onkaparinga
 Hundred of Kuitpo in the south east spanning the Adelaide Hills from the upper Onkaparinga and South Eastern Freeway to Mount Magnificent

See also
 Lands administrative divisions of South Australia

References

Adelaide